Laura Smith (born 16 March 1985) is a British Labour Party politician who served as the Member of Parliament (MP) for Crewe and Nantwich from 2017 to 2019. In 2017, she defeated the incumbent Conservative Edward Timpson by 48 votes, before losing her seat at the 2019 general election.

In February 2020, Smith was elected to Cheshire East Council for the Crewe South ward.

Early life and career 
Smith was raised in Crewe; her grandfather was a miner and trade unionist and her father was heavily involved with the Labour Party. She attended Brine Leas School in Nantwich, Cheshire and South Cheshire College in Crewe. She went on to study at Crewe campus of Manchester Metropolitan University, qualifying as a school teacher.

She was dissatisfied with work as a teacher and began a tutoring business.

Political career 
Smith was involved in the campaign against school funding cuts in Cheshire East. She told the Crewe Chronicle: "I sat at home after going to a public meeting at Brine Leas School" about proposed education cuts "and I decided enough was enough regarding the funding for schools and I posted something on Facebook. From that, I got involved with the fairer funding".

Smith was announced as the Labour Party candidate for the Crewe and Nantwich constituency in the snap 2017 general election on 1 May 2017. She launched her campaign on 3 May, saying "What ordinary people need are decent well-paid jobs and greater job security. In this race locally, I am the only candidate committed to that." She also said that she was not a "natural-born politician" and promised to be a "different sort of MP if elected that remains accessible and up front with her constituents". In the election, Smith defeated incumbent Conservative junior minister Edward Timpson by 48 votes, overturning a majority of 3,620. She declared that the result "sent a message to the establishment and the elite", the seat having been held by the Conservatives in elections since Gwyneth Dunwoody died in 2008. The seat saw a 3.7% swing to Labour, and an increase in turnout of 3%, to just under 70%.

On 13 June 2018, Smith and five other Labour MPs resigned their roles as frontbenchers for the Labour Party in protest at Labour's Brexit position. Leader Jeremy Corbyn had instructed his MPs to abstain in a vote which Britain would remain in the single market by joining the European Economic Area (EEA). Following her resignation Smith voted against the EEA. Smith also resigned her position as a Shadow Cabinet Office Minister. However, despite this stance, Smith abstained from a vote to delay the United Kingdom's withdrawal from the European Union for a time sufficient to enable a second referendum on leaving the EU to be held.

In September 2018 Smith called for a general strike to "topple" Theresa May's Conservative government. Deputy Labour Leader, Tom Watson, quickly distanced the Labour Party from Smith saying her comments were "not particularly helpful". Shadow business secretary Rebecca Long-Bailey added: "Just to make it perfectly clear a general strike is not Labour Party policy."

Smith lost her seat in the 2019 general election, to Kieran Mullan of the Conservative Party. The Labour vote was down 9.7% to 37.4% and the Conservative vote up 6.1% to 53.1% giving Kieran Mullan a majority of 8,508. In January 2020 Smith appeared on BBC Radio 5 Live to speak about her life since losing the election, and to dispel what she described as "the misconception... that people who are members of parliament – even local councillors – are kind of sitting on a bank of reserves or will automatically have connections who will come and want to hire you". The interview came after Smith was photographed at her local job centre.

On 27 February 2020, Smith was elected to Cheshire East Council for the Crewe South ward.

Political views
Smith identifies as a socialist and was part of the Socialist Campaign Group of Labour MPs during her time in parliament. She is a supporter of the Labour Against Private Schools campaign, which aims to abolish private schools in the United Kingdom.

Personal life
Smith lives in Nantwich with her two children.

References

External links

1985 births
Living people
Labour Party (UK) MPs for English constituencies
UK MPs 2017–2019
Female members of the Parliament of the United Kingdom for English constituencies
Alumni of Manchester Metropolitan University
People educated at Brine Leas School
People educated at South Cheshire College
21st-century British women politicians
Schoolteachers from Cheshire
English socialists
21st-century English women
21st-century English people
People from the Borough of Cheshire East
Labour Party (UK) councillors
Councillors in Cheshire